Trevor Noah (born 20 February 1984) is a South African comedian, writer, producer, political commentator, actor, and former television host. He was the host of The Daily Show, an American late-night talk show and satirical news program on Comedy Central, from 2015 to 2022. Noah has won various awards, including a Primetime Emmy Award from 11 nominations. He was named one of "The 35 Most Powerful People in New York Media" by The Hollywood Reporter in 2017 and 2018. In 2018, Time magazine named him one of the hundred most influential people in the world.

Born in Johannesburg, Noah began his career in South Africa in 2002. He had several hosting roles with the South African Broadcasting Corporation (SABC) and was the runner-up in the fourth season of South Africa's iteration of Strictly Come Dancing in 2008. From 2010 to 2011, he hosted the late-night talk show Tonight with Trevor Noah, which he created and aired on M-Net and DStv.

In 2014, Noah became the Senior International Correspondent for The Daily Show, and in 2015 succeeded long-time host Jon Stewart. His autobiographical comedy book Born a Crime was published in 2016. He hosted the 63rd Annual Grammy Awards in 2021, the 2022 edition, the 2023 edition as well as the 2022 White House Correspondents Dinner.

Early life

Trevor Noah was born on 20 February 1984, in Johannesburg, Transvaal (now Gauteng), South Africa. His father, Robert, is of Swiss-German ancestry, and his mother, Patricia Nombuyiselo Noah, is Xhosa.

Under apartheid legislation, Noah's mother was classified as Black, and his father was classified as White. Noah himself was classified as Coloured. At the time of his birth, his parents' interracial relationship was illegal, which Noah highlights in his autobiography. Interracial sexual relations and marriages were decriminalized a year after his birth, when the Immorality Act was amended in 1985. Patricia and her mother, Nomalizo Frances Noah, raised Trevor in the black township of Soweto. Noah began his schooling at Maryvale College, a private Roman Catholic primary and high school in Maryvale, Gauteng, a suburb of Johannesburg.

Career

Early work and breakthrough 

In 2002, Noah had a small role on an episode of the South African soap opera Isidingo. He later hosted his own radio show Noah's Ark on Gauteng's leading youth-radio station, YFM. He dropped his radio show and acting to focus on comedy, and has performed with South African comedians such as: David Kau, Kagiso Lediga, Riaad Moosa, Darren Simpson, Marc Lottering, Barry Hilton, and Nik Rabinowitz, international comedians such as Paul Rodriguez, Carl Barron, Dan Ilic, and Paul Zerdin, and as the opening act for American comedian Gabriel Iglesias in November 2007 and Canadian comedian Russell Peters on his South African tour.

Noah hosted an educational TV programme, Run the Adventure (2004–2006) on SABC 2. In 2007, he hosted The Real Goboza, a gossip-themed show on SABC 1, and Siyadlala, a sports show also on the SABC. In 2008, Noah cohosted, alongside Pabi Moloi, The Amazing Date (a dating gameshow) and was a Strictly Come Dancing contestant in the fourth series. In 2009, he hosted the 3rd Annual South Africa Film and Television Awards (SAFTAs) and co-hosted alongside Eugene Khoza on The Axe Sweet Life, a reality competition series. In 2010, Noah hosted the 16th annual South African Music Awards and also hosted Tonight with Trevor Noah on MNet (for the second series, it moved to DStv's Mzansi Magic Channel). In 2010, Noah also became a spokesperson and consumer protection agent for Cell C, South Africa's third-largest mobile phone network provider.

Noah performed in The Blacks Only Comedy Show, the Heavyweight Comedy Jam, the Vodacom Campus Comedy Tour, the Cape Town International Comedy Festival, the Jozi Comedy Festival, and Bafunny Bafunny (2010). His stand-up comedy specials in South Africa include The Daywalker (2009), Crazy Normal (2011), That's Racist (2012), and It's My Culture (2013).

In 2011, he relocated to the United States. In January 2012, Noah became the first South African stand-up comedian to appear on The Tonight Show; and in May 2013, he became the first to appear on Late Show with David Letterman. Noah was the subject of the 2012 documentary You Laugh But It's True. The same year, he starred in the one-man comedy show Trevor Noah: The Racist, which was based on his similarly titled South African special That's Racist. In September 2012, Noah was the Roastmaster in a Comedy Central Roast of South African Afrikaans singer Steve Hofmeyr. In 2013, he performed the comedy special Trevor Noah: African American. In October 2013, he was a guest on BBC Two's comedy panel show QI. In November 2013, he was a panelist on Channel 4 game show 8 Out of 10 Cats and appeared on Sean Lock's team in 8 Out of 10 Cats Does Countdown in September 2014.

The Daily Show 

In December 2014, Noah became a recurring contributor on The Daily Show. In March 2015, Comedy Central announced that Noah would succeed Jon Stewart as host of The Daily Show; his tenure began on 28 September 2015.

Following his announcement as Stewart's successor, attention was drawn on the Internet to jokes he had posted on his Twitter account, some of which were criticised as being offensive to women, and others as antisemitic or mocking the Holocaust. Noah responded by tweeting: "To reduce my views to a handful of jokes that didn't land is not a true reflection of my character, nor my evolution as a comedian." Comedy Central stood behind Noah, saying in a statement, "Like many comedians, Trevor Noah pushes boundaries; he is provocative and spares no one, himself included... To judge him or his comedy based on a handful of jokes is unfair. Trevor is a talented comedian with a bright future at Comedy Central." Mary Kluk, chairperson of the South African Jewish Board of Deputies (SAJBD), said that the jokes were not signs of anti-Jewish prejudice and that they were part of Noah's style of comedy. Noah has faced further criticism  after video clips of him joking about Aboriginal women and the Marikana massacre in old standup routines resurfaced.

After Noah took over from Stewart, viewership dropped 37%, and its Nielsen ratings fell below those of several other shows hosted by Daily Show alumni; however, according to Comedy Central's president, the Daily Show under Noah was the number-one show for millennials. James Poniewozik of The New York Times praised him and the show's writers, saying, "Mr. Noah's debut was largely successful, it was also because of the operating system—the show's writing—running under the surface". Robert Lloyd of the Los Angeles Times described him as "charming and composed—almost inevitably low-key compared with the habitually antic and astonished Stewart". Other critics gave him less favorable reviews, with Salon writing "Jon Stewart created a national treasure. Noah has dulled its knife, weakened the satire, let the powerful run free." Noah's platform on the show has led to three stand-up specials on Comedy Central and Netflix. By 2017, nightly viewership was less than half of what it had been during the end of Stewart's tenure; viewership among millennials remained solid, however, and Comedy Central extended Noah's contract as host of The Daily Show through 2022. He would also produce and host annual end-of-year specials for Comedy Central.

After France won the 2018 FIFA World Cup, Noah commented, "I get it, they have to say it's the French team. But look at those guys. You don't get that tan by hanging out in the south of France, my friends. Basically if you don't understand, France is Africans' backup team." The French Ambassador to the United States, Gérard Araud, issued a letter condemning Noah's joke. He wrote, "Unlike the United States of America, France does not refer to its citizens based on their race, religion or origin. For us, there is no hyphenated identity, the roots are an individual reality. By calling them an African team, it seems that you are denying their Frenchness." Noah responded to the controversy, saying he did not intend to deny that the team was French, and instead to celebrate their African heritage.

In April 2017, Noah began developing a talk show for Jordan Klepper: The Opposition with Jordan Klepper, which premiered in September, and ran for one season. Noah also executive-produced Klepper, a primetime weekly docuseries, beginning in May 2019. In March 2018, Noah signed a multiyear contract with Viacom giving them first-look rights to any future projects by him. In addition to the deal, Noah would also be launching an international production and distribution company called Day Zero Productions.

In October 2022, after Rishi Sunak became Prime Minister of the United Kingdom, Noah claimed that there was a racist backlash in the U.K. against someone of Indian heritage taking that role. British Conservative politician Sajid Javid described Noah's remarks as "A narrative catered to his audience, at a cost of being completely detached from reality." There were suggestions that Noah was projecting the U.S. political context onto the U.K.—English author Tom Holland stated: "As ever, the inability of American liberals to understand the world beyond the US in anything but American terms is a thing of wonder." Sunak's spokesperson insisted, in response to Noah's claims, that the U.K. is not a racist country; Noah stated that he never made a statement about the country as a whole, only about "some people".

On , Noah requested some extra minutes during that night's program and announced that he would be leaving The Daily Show at an undetermined future date after hosting the show for seven years. After revisiting stand-up comedy, he felt a longing to return to visiting countries for shows, learning new languages and "being everywhere, doing everything". It was confirmed the following month that Noah's last show would be on 8 December 2022.

Books 

His memoir Born a Crime was published in November 2016 and was received favorably by major U.S. book reviewers. Other than the author, his mother has a central role in the book, while his European father is mentioned only occasionally. It became a No. 1 New York Times Bestseller and was named one of the best books of the year by The New York Times, Newsday, Esquire, NPR, and Booklist. It was announced that a film adaptation based on the book would star Lupita Nyong'o as his mother.

In July 2018, Noah and The Daily Show writing staff released The Donald J. Trump Presidential Twitter Library, a book comprising hundreds of Trump tweets and featuring a foreword by Pulitzer Prize-winning historian Jon Meacham.

Other work

In 2017, he made an appearance on the TV series Nashville. In 2018, he appeared in Black Panther, Coming 2 America, and American Vandal.

In addition to hosting The Daily Show, Noah has hosted the Grammy Awards thrice in 2021, in 2022 as well as in 2023. He also served as host of the White House Correspondents' Dinner in 2022.

Influences 

In 2013, Noah said of his comedic influences,  He also cited Jon Stewart as an influence and a mentor, following his appointment to succeed Stewart as host of The Daily Show. In an interview with The New York Times, Noah likened Stewart to "a Jewish Yoda" and recounted advice Stewart gave him, saying, 

Among comedians who say they were influenced by Noah are Michelle Wolf, Jordan Klepper, and Hasan Minhaj. Noah's mixed-race ancestry, his experiences growing up in Soweto, and his observations about race and ethnicity are leading themes in his comedy.

Personal life 

Noah speaks English, Southern Sotho, Zulu, Xhosa, Tswana, Tsonga and very basic Afrikaans. Noah has ADHD. He resides in New York City.

In 1992, Noah's mother, Patricia Nombuyiselo, married Ngisaveni Abel Shingange; they had two sons together. Shingange physically abused both Trevor and his mother, and the couple legally divorced in 1996. In 2009, after Patricia married Sfiso Khoza, Shingange shot her in the leg and through the back of her head; she survived as the bullet went through the base of her head, avoiding the spinal cord, brain, and all major nerves and blood vessels, then exiting with minor damage to her nostril. When Noah confronted him over the phone about the shooting, Shingange threatened his life, prompting Noah to leave Johannesburg for Los Angeles.

In 2011, Shingange was convicted of attempted murder and sentenced the following year to three years of correctional supervision. Noah stated that he hoped the attention surrounding the incident would raise awareness of the broader issue of domestic violence in South Africa: "For years my mother reached out to police for help with domestic abuse, and nothing was ever done. This is the norm in South Africa. Dockets went missing and cases never went to court."

Noah has described himself as being progressive and having a global perspective. However, he has clarified that he considers himself a "progressive person", but not a "political progressive" and prefers not to be categorized as being either right or left in the context of US partisanship.

In April 2018, Noah launched The Trevor Noah Foundation, a youth development initiative that empowers youth with the foundation for a better life: access to high-quality education. Noah's vision is a world where an education enables youth to dream, see and build the impossible.  

Noah was selected as the Class Day speaker for Princeton University's Class of 2021. He gave his address virtually on 15 May 2021, and was inducted as an honorary member of the Class of 2021.

Filmography

Film

Television

Awards

Bibliography

Audiobooks 

 2016: Born a Crime: Stories from a South African Childhood (read by the author), Audible Studios on Brilliance Audio,

See also

 New Yorkers in journalism

References

External links 

 
 

1984 births
21st-century South African male actors
21st-century South African writers
Coloured South African people
Late night television talk show hosts
Living people
South African male comedians
Male television writers
Media critics
People from Soweto
People of Swiss-German descent
Progressivism in South Africa
Shorty Award winners
South African autobiographers
South African stand-up comedians
South African emigrants to the United States
South African expatriates in the United States
South African male television actors
South African people of Swiss descent
South African people of Xhosa descent
South African satirists
South African television producers
South African television writers
Xhosa people
People with attention deficit hyperactivity disorder